Rucăr is a commune in the north-eastern part of Argeș County, Muntenia, Romania. At the 2011 census, the population of the commune was 5,752. It is composed of two villages, Rucăr and Sătic. Located on the Rucăr-Bran Pass, it is popular with tourists from Bran Castle.

Natives
 Dan Nistor (born 1988), footballer
 Victor Slăvescu (1891–1977), economist and politician

References

Communes in Argeș County
Localities in Muntenia